"When Alice Comes Back to the Farm" is a rock-blues song recorded by The Move and written and sung by Roy Wood. Musically, it is a hard rock song and features Wood playing slide guitar, cello and baritone saxophone, reinforcing Rick Price's bassline.

Release
Taken from the 1970 album Looking On and released as a single on the Fly label, "Alice" failed to chart, largely due to lack of airplay by BBC radio stations. The song allegedly made mild references to cannabis—"Alice", "time for tearing out the weeds", and the last line "don't get around much anymore", which is a description of the singer's condition rather than a reference to the Duke Ellington song.

References
                 

The Move - When Alice Comes Back To The Farm (1970, Vinyl) on Discogs

The Move songs
Song recordings produced by Roy Wood
Song recordings produced by Jeff Lynne
1970 singles
Songs written by Roy Wood
1970 songs
Fly Records singles
Songs about cannabis